Nonanol is a type of simple alcohol. Its isomers include: 

 1-Nonanol
 2-Nonanol

Nonanols